Apriona neglectissima is a species of beetle in the family Cerambycidae. It was described by de Jong in 1936. It is known from Borneo.

References

Batocerini
Beetles described in 1936